The Platz der Freiheit is a Munich square at the intersection of Landshuter Allee / Leonrodstraße in the Neuhausen district.

History 
The Platz der Freiheit was originally called Hindenburgplatz and was renamed in 1946 in honour of the victims of National Socialism.

40 years after the end of the war, a granite memorial stone designed by Karl Oppenrieder and dedicated to "The victims in the resistance against National Socialism" was erected on this site. In 1962, it was initially erected as a temporary measure on the Platz der Opfer des Nationalsozialismus (Place for the victims of National Socialism). After a stele with an eternal light was erected there, the stone came here in 1985. The artist Wolfram P. Kastner planned to erect another monument on the square. Around the square he wants to place names, portraits and life stories of people who rebelled against the Nazi regime on a "yellow ribbon of remembrance". It was opened in July 2016 and will probably be preserved until 2019.

References 

Squares in Munich
Buildings and structures in Munich
Tourist attractions in Munich
Heritage sites in Bavaria
Culture in Munich